Eulepidotis perducens is a moth of the family Erebidae first described by Francis Walker in 1858. It is found in the Neotropics, including Jamaica and Guyana.

References

Moths described in 1858
perducens